Soulan James Pownceby (née Soulan James Rikihana, born 4 May 1975 in Christchurch) is a New Zealand boxer who was described by TVNZ in 2004 as one of New Zealand's most exciting talents since David Tua. He is also notable for convictions for assault and manslaughter.

Amateur career 
As an amateur, Pownceby was one of the New Zealand team's main hopes for a boxing medal in the 2006 Melbourne Commonwealth games but he was eliminated from the competition after losing 6–26 against his first opponent.

Pownceby had an impressive amateur record and won numerous New Zealand gold medals as a middle weight, light-heavy weight, and heavy weight.

Pownceby was also selected for the 2004 Athens Olympics and was the only boxer chosen to represent New Zealand at this event. Pownceby was eliminated from the competition after losing 19–33 against his first opponent.

Pownceby is a four time New Zealand National Amateur Champion, winning in 2001 (Middle), 2002 (Light Heavy), 2005 (Light Heavy) and 2006 (Heavy).

Professional career
Pownceby defeated Joel Casey for the World Boxing Foundation light-heavyweight title on 17 June 2010. Pownceby, who was ranked 9th in the July 2010 WBO light heavyweight rankings, was in superb form and won the fight over 12 rounds.

Pownceby has also held the WBO Asia Pacific light-heavyweight title after defeating Togasilamai Letoa in a 12-round fight.

Pownceby is ranked fifth in New Zealand's pound for pound record.

After defeating Daniel MacKinnon, Pownceby was ranked 1st in WBO in July 2012, however despite reaching the number one mandatory position, Pownceby would not be able to fight for a world title due passed convictions which makes him unable to leave the county. Pownceby was unable to fight again due to a serious neck injury.

Professional boxing titles
New Zealand National Boxing Federation (NZNBF) cruiserweight title (180½ Ibs)
WBO Asia Pacific light heavyweight title (174½ Ibs)
World Boxing Foundation World light heavyweight title (175 Ibs)

Professional boxing record

Convictions
On 19 October 1994, Pownceby killed his five-month-old daughter Jeanette Rikihana. Despite claiming to Police that he had dropped her in the shower, the post-mortem revealed "horrendous injuries - severe bruising to the head, including a cracked skull, and internal bruising." In addition to the injuries that resulted in her death, the autopsy also revealed that the baby was suffering from "six fractured ribs caused by a chest injury at least two weeks before her death" and was "malnourished with wasting buttocks and thighs".

Pownceby was charged with murder, however the jury at his murder trial ruled that he was not guilty of murder but was guilty of manslaughter. Pownceby was sentenced to four years in jail.

During the period 1998 to 2000, Pownceby was convicted of four violent assaults. One of these assaults was committed against an unnamed woman.

Personal life
Pownceby has faced numerous difficulties throughout his life. His father (a United States Navy serviceman) has never acknowledged him, his sister was murdered by her partner in 1990, and his mother died of cancer in 1993. Pownceby was jailed in 1995 for four years for the manslaughter of his 5-month-old daughter and converted to Catholicism following his release from prison in 1998. In 2004 Pownceby said he could not change the past but that he was "trying to be the best person I can be".

In 2006 Pownceby announced that he intended to donate his first professional boxing purse to child cancer.

References

Living people
1975 births
Olympic boxers of New Zealand
Boxers at the 2004 Summer Olympics
Boxers at the 2006 Commonwealth Games
New Zealand professional boxing champions
New Zealand people convicted of manslaughter
New Zealand male boxers
Prisoners and detainees of New Zealand
Unitec Institute of Technology alumni
Light-heavyweight boxers
Commonwealth Games competitors for New Zealand
New Zealand world boxing champions